is a Japanese professional shogi player ranked 7-dan.

Early life
Kajiura was born in the Shinjuku ward of Tokyo, Japan on July 6, 1995. He learned how to play shogi from his father when he was about five years old, and eventually entered the Japan Shogi Association's apprentice school at the rank of 6-kyū under the tutelage of shogi professional Daisuke Suzuki in 2008. He was promoted to the rank of 3-dan in 2012 and then obtained full professional status and the rank of 4-dan after finishing in second place in the 56th 3-dan League with a record of 13 wins and 5 losses.

Promotion history
The promotion history for Kajiura is as follows. 
 6-kyū: April 2008
 3-dan: October 2012
 4-dan: April 1, 2015
 5-dan: July 25, 2019
 6-dan: June 4, 2020
 7-dan: May 6, 2021

References

External links
ShogiHub: Professional Player Info · Kajiura, Hirotaka

Japanese shogi players
Living people
Professional shogi players
Professional shogi players from Tokyo
1995 births
People from Shinjuku